Odd Nerdrum (born 8 April 1944) is a  Norwegian figurative painter, born in Sweden, and considered to be one of the greatest, living, classical, figurative painters.
His work is held by museums worldwide. Themes and style in Nerdrum's work reference anecdote and narrative. Primary influences by the painters Rembrandt and Caravaggio help place his work in direct conflict with the abstraction and conceptual art considered acceptable in much of Norway. Nerdrum creates six to eight paintings a year. They include still life paintings of small, everyday objects (like bricks), portraits and self-portraits, and large paintings allegorical and apocalyptic in nature. The figures in Nerdrum's paintings are often dressed as if from another time and place.

Nerdrum was born in Helsingborg, Sweden, because his parents were resistance fighters who had fled German-occupied Norway during World War II. At the end of the war Nerdrum returned to Norway with his parents. By 1950 Nerdrum's parents had divorced leaving the mother to raise Nerdrum and his younger brother. In 1993, Nerdrum discovered his father was not his biological father; his mother had had a relationship with the architect David Sandved. Nerdrum was born from this liaison. 

Nerdrum was educated in a Rudolf Steiner school and later at the Art Academy of Oslo. Disillusioned with the art form taught at the academy and with modern art in general Nerdrum began to teach himself to paint in a post-modern style with Rembrandt and Caravaggio as influences. In 1965, he began a several-months study with the German artist Joseph Beuys. Nerdrum says that his art should be understood as kitsch rather than art as such. On Kitsch, a manifesto composed by Nerdrum, describes the distinction he makes between kitsch and art.
Nerdrum's philosophy has spawned The Kitsch Movement among his students and followers, who call themselves kitsch painters rather than artists.

Biography

Early life
Odd Nerdrum was born in Helsingborg, Sweden in 1944. His parents, Resistance fighters, had been sent to Sweden from German-occupied Norway to direct guerrilla activities from outside the country. A year later, at the end of the war, Odd and his parents moved back to Norway. Lillemor, his mother, soon after went to New York to study at the Fashion Institute of Technology. The feeling of being unwanted and abandoned Nerdrum felt at this time would stay with him until he was in his late forties, and he often felt emotionally distanced. In 1950, Nerdrum's parents divorced, leaving Nerdrum's mother, Lillemor, to raise two small children, Odd, and his younger brother.

Nerdrum's father, Johan Nerdrum, later remarried. Although he was supportive of Odd, he kept an emotional distance between himself and his son. At his death, Odd was asked not to attend the funeral. He found out three years later that Johan was not his biological father. Odd, was in fact, the result of a liaison between David Sandved and Lillemor. Lillemor and Sandved had had a relationship prior to Lillemor's marriage, and this was resumed during the war in a period when Johan was absent. Richard Vine, art critic, describes this episode in Nerdrum's life as one which created "a conflicted preoccupation with origins and personal identity", that "came natural to Nerdrum" and was represented in his pictures. He would go on to make paintings about these experiences.

Early education
Nerdrum began his formal education in 1951 in Oslo, in the private Oslo Waldorf School (Rudolf Steiner school) rather than in the standard, public school system. This education would set Odd apart from his contemporaries. The system was based on anthroposophy that saw mankind as once living in harmony with the universe but now existing in a lesser state of rationality. Through spiritual or esoteric practice, Steiner believed mankind could find its way back to a connection with higher realities and to renewed harmony with the universe. Learning for students was often kinesthetic, for example, through dramatic enactments of history and fantasy, and through musical exercises that were reminiscent of the patterns found on ancient Greek vases, depicting figures moving in parallel patterns. These parallel patterns could be found in later Nerdrum work, as can a sensibility for iconographic images and costume.

Jens Bjørneboe, Norwegian author and mentor, said Nerdrum even at a young age exhibited tendencies of innate talent and industry, but also impatience with those with less ability than himself.

Personal life 
Odd Nerdrum has been married to fellow painter Turid Spildo since 1995. Spildo is artistic director of the Nerdrum Studio. They have two sons, Öde and Bork; and twin daughters, Aftur and Myndin. Their adult children are engaged in creative endeavors, including art, documentary, plays and acting, much of which are engaged with the Nerdrum family.

Artistic study
Nerdrum began study at the Norwegian National Academy of Fine Arts, but became dissatisfied with the direction of modern art, notably Rauschenberg's work, and began to teach himself how to paint in a Neo-Baroque style, with the guidance of Rembrandt's technique and work as a primary influence. Nerdrum had seen Rembrandt's painting, The Conspiracy of Claudius Civilis in the National Museum of Fine Arts in Stockholm. Nerdrum says seeing the painting was "a shock... Pervasive. Like finding home. I can say I found a home in this picture,... The wonderful thing with Rembrandt is the confidence he inspires - like when you warm your hands on a stove. Without Rembrandt I would have been so poor". By abandoning the accepted path of modern art, Nerdrum had placed himself in direct opposition to most aspects of the school, including his primary painting instructor, his fellow students, and a curriculum designed to present Norway as a country with an up-to-date artistic culture. He, in his own words, was chased from the academy after a two-year period like a "scroungy mutt". Years later Nerdrum said:

I saw that I was in the process of making a choice that would end in defeat. By choosing those qualities that were so alien to my own time, I had to give up at the same time the art on which the art of our time rests. I had to paint in defiance of my own era without the protection of the era's superstructure. Briefly put I would paint myself into isolation.

Nerdrum later studied with Joseph Beuys, at the Kunstakademie Düsseldorf. However, he continued to feel isolated from the other students, who nicknamed him "Zorn" from the notorious Swedish "flesh-painter."

Influences
Rembrandt and Caravaggio are primary influences on Nerdrum's work, while secondary influences include Masaccio, Leonardo da Vinci, Michelangelo, Titian, and the less obvious influences, according to Vine and either mentioned by Nerdrum himself or other critics, that include Pieter Bruegel the Elder, Goya, Chardin, Millet, as well as the even less apparent Henry Fuseli, Caspar David Friedrich, Ferdinand Hodler, Edvard Munch, Käthe Kollwitz, Salvador Dalí, Chaïm Soutine and Lars Hertervig.

Direction

Early work (1964–1982)
Nerdrum's work from the first twenty years of his artistic life consisted of large canvasses, generally polemic in nature, that served to refute accepted social or economic viewpoints. The work from this period was highly representational and detailed in nature with often careful attention to contemporary references, such as in clothing, or in the model of a bicycle as in the painting The Arrest. Vine notes that, Nerdrum's influence was not, as might be expected, given the themes of the work, the ideological Ashcan school movement, although similar in subject matter. In 1968, Nerdrum had viewed for the first time the works of Caravaggio whose psychologically intense work, use of cross lighting, strongly suggested shadow that implied three dimensionality, and use of the faces of real, everyday people impacted him intensely, and provided one of the major influences for his work of this time period. He would revisit Italy and Caravaggio's work for on-going inspiration for many years.

As well, Nerdrum was a reader of visionary literature that included works by Rudolf Steiner, the prophetic William Blake, the dark Dostoyevsky, and the mystical Swedenborg. This would influence him towards a more vertical sensibility rather than the linear Marxist view based on revolution that influenced most artists with socially reformist sensibilities.

As a young student, Nerdrum had encountered the works of the master painters in the National Museum. In particular, Rembrandt's  The Conspiracy of Claudius Civilis (1661) acted as a powerful antidote to his sensibilities. His disillusionment with modern art, such as Robert Rauschenberg's Monogram,  a stuffed goat with a tire around its middle section standing on a flat, littered surface, which Nerdrum had encountered in the Museum of Modern Art in Stockholm, filled the young artist with disgust.

These influences both positive and negative would impact all of Nerdrum's work. A turning point in Nerdrum's work - the end of Nerdrum's more contemporary scene-like work, and the movement towards more Rembrandt-like painting elements- revolved around the enormous (11x16¾ foot) Refugees At Sea (1979–1980). Nerdrum, according to Vine, later considered the work to be naive in the sense that Rousseau defines the word, in which mankind is seen as innocent and innately good. In the painting Nerdrum endows the refugees, 27 Vietnamese boat people, with heroic stature, but in a highly sentimentalized manner that Nerdrum later described as "cloying".

Change in direction
In 1981 Nerdrum created a seminal work that would serve to indicate a change in direction from the sentimentalized view of Refugees at Sea to a starker, unadorned view of reality. Twilight, a rear view of a young woman alone in a wooded landscape defecating, offers nothing sentimental or ideal in its betrayal, but instead offers a stripped away view of life and reality.

Paintings were no longer as multi-figured as they had been with Refugees at Sea, and still lifes were of individual objects such as a brick or loaf of bread. The individuals who now populated Nerdrum's paintings were imbued with great quiet and stillness, but as Vine says, additionally were vitally alive, evoking a cosmic oneness that transcended individuality.

These figures — types rather than endowed with features or apparent stories that might distinguish them as individual — were costumed in garments that seemed timeless such as furs, skins, or leather caps, rather than in clothing that would link the viewer to a specific time and place.

Archetypal-like, these beings, inhabited pre-social, apocalyptic-like circumstances that included stark, severe landscapes, a reference to some place beyond our own time and space.

Painting technique
Nerdrum's approach to painting is based on traditional methods that included mixing and grinding his own pigments, working on canvas he had stretched or stretched by assistants rather than on pre-stretched canvas, and working from live models, often himself, and in many cases members of his own family.  In 2011, Nerdrum stated that the technique he used in the 1980s was faulty, "a special mixture of oils and paint in an effort to recreate the style of the old masters" which subsequently melted and disintegrated.

Process
Of his process Nerdrum says: "When I paint as if I struggle in the water. I will try with all means not to drown. Sandpaper, rags, my fingers, the knife--in short everything. The brush is rarely used."

Drawings and prints
Odd Nerdrum prints are based on his paintings.  For example, an etching entitled Baby is based on a painting of the same title from 1982. Nerdrum refers to his highly finished, charcoal drawings as "paintings"  Often his drawings are large in scale and are works in their own right, as well as being studies for future paintings.

On kitsch

Odd Nerdrum has declared himself to be a kitsch-painter identifying himself with kitsch rather than with the contemporary art world. Initially, Nerdrum's declaration was thought to be a joke but later, and with the publication of articles and books on the subject, Nerdrum's position can be seen as an implied criticism of contemporary art.

Collections
Odd Nerdrum's work is held in public collections worldwide including the National Gallery, in Oslo, the Astrup Fearnley Museum of Modern Art, in Oslo, the Hirshhorn Museum and Sculpture Garden, in Washington, D.C., the Metropolitan Museum of Art, in New York, the New Orleans Museum of Art, in New Orleans, the Museum of Contemporary Art San Diego, in San Diego, and the Walker Art Center, in Minneapolis.

Odd Nerdrum is represented by the Forum Gallery, New York.

Court cases
In 2011, Nerdrum was convicted in Norway of tax evasion and sentenced to two years in prison. An appeal was filed.  His defense claimed that a very large amount of money stored in a safe deposit box in Austria was "a safety measure against future claims" for some 36 paintings that Nerdrum had created in the 1980’s using an experimental medium which began to melt when exposed to heat."  The sentence was criticised as excessive while art professor Øivind Storm Bjerke called the sentence "strict" Supporters stated that there were flaws in the proceedings of the trial, such as faulty evidence. Nerdrum claimed the case was an attempt at political persecution.

In January 2012, the Norwegian court of appeal granted Nerdrum a new trial. The trial began on 11 June. After three trial days, Nerdrum was once again convicted of tax evasion and sentenced to two years and ten months in prison. In 2013, the verdict was set aside by the Supreme Court of Norway; in 2014 court of appeals found him guilty of tax evasion and he was sentenced to 20 months in prison;  8 months were suspended. Under Norwegian law, Nerdrum would be forbidden from any painting activity in prison, as prisoners in Norway are not allowed to pursue business activities while incarcerated.

In October 2012, Nerdrum lost a suit filed against the regional tax authority. The Oslo court ruled that the funds that Nerdrum had set aside in Austria did not constitute a 'loan, security, depot or committed funds' and should have been disclosed as income.

In September 2017 Nerdrum was pardoned by King Harald of Norway.

Nerdrum's work as inspiration
A 2000 horror film, The Cell, contains a scene that was heavily influenced by Nerdrum's 1989 painting Dawn. The scene features three identical figures sitting down, looking upwards with pained, trance-like expressions on their faces. Director Tarsem Singh in the film's audio commentary says that the painting was the inspiration for the scene's imagery. Singh had seen the painting while visiting the owner of the painting, David Bowie.

Australian choreographer, Meryl Tankard's 2009 dance piece, The Oracle, was inspired by the work of Nerdrum. The work, featuring the dancer Paul White, was about the human being in constant struggle with forces outside of itself.

The Norwegian classical composer Martin Romberg wrote a collection of piano pieces inspired by three of Nerdrum's works in 2014, named Tableaux Kitsch. The pieces are inspired by the paintings To the Lighthouse, Stranded, and Drifting, and were premiered at Nerdrum's exhibitions in Paris 2013 and Barcelona 2016.

Exhibitions
 Skiens Kunstforening, Skien, Norway "Minner" June–September 2017
 Galleri Agardh Tornvall, Stockholm, Sweden "Making Painting Great again" November 2017
 Mollbrink's Art Gallery, Uppsala, Sweden "Making Painting great again" March 2018

Publications
 Odd Nerdrum, Joacim Ericsson, Per Lundgren, David Molesky, Richard T. Scott, Richard Vine. The Nerdrum School: The Master and His Students. Oslo, Norway: Orfeus Publishing, Nov. 2013. .
 Odd Nerdrum, Jan-Ove Tuv, Bjorn Li, Dag Solhjell, Tommy Sorbo, Maria Kreyn, Kitsch: More than Art. Oslo, Norway: Schibsted 2011. .
 Odd Nerdrum, Bjørn Li. Odd Nerdrum: themes: paintings, drawings, prints and sculptures. Oslo, Norway: Press Publishing, 2007. .
 Odd Nerdrum and Richard Vine. Odd Nerdrum: paintings, sketches and drawings. Oslo, Norway: Gyldendal Fakta, 2001. .
 Odd Nerdrum, On Kitsch Oslo, Norway: Kagge Publishing, 2001 
 Odd Nerdrum and Jan-Erik Ebbestad Hansen. Odd Nerdrum: paintings. Oslo, Norway: Aschehoug, 1995. .
 Odd Nerdrum, Jan Åke Pettersson and Astrup Fearnley Museet for Moderne Kunst. Odd Nerdrum: storyteller and self-revealer. Oslo, Norway: Astrup Fearnley museet for moderne kunst: Aschehoug, 1999. .
 Odd Nerdrum, Richard Vine, E John Bullard and New Orleans Museum of Art. Odd Nerdrum, the drawings. New Orleans, Louisiana: New Orleans Museum of Art, 1994. .

References

External links
 Odd Nerdrum: A collection of 63 works (HD), Video 6:49.
 Odd Nerdrum: The Self-portrait (2015), Video 34:29.
 Odd Nerdrum official website
 Forum Gallery - the gallery representing Nerdrum

1944 births
Living people
20th-century Norwegian painters
21st-century Norwegian painters
Norwegian male painters
21st-century male artists
Postmodern artists
Artists from Oslo
People educated at Oslo Waldorf School
Norwegian expatriates in Iceland
Kunstakademie Düsseldorf alumni